The Quitman County School District is a public school district in Quitman County, Georgia, United States, based in Georgetown. It serves the communities of Georgetown and Morris.

Schools
The Quitman County School District has three schools that house pre-school to twelfth grade on one campus.

Elementary and middle school
 New Quitman County Elementary/Middle School (pre-kindergarten - 8th grade)

High school
Quitman County High School (grades 9–12)
This is the newest school in the Quitman County School System. Established in 2009, it split from neighboring Stewart County High School. QCHS has  of space. Each classroom is equipped with smart board technology. The new facility includes a media center, band room, and weight room. The gymnasium seats over 500 people. Its principal is Jon-Erik Jones.

References

External links

School districts in Georgia (U.S. state)
Education in Quitman County, Georgia